Eduardo Horacio García (born January 22, 1956) is a prelate of the Roman Catholic Church. He serves as auxiliary bishop of Buenos Aires since 2003.

Life 
Born in Buenos Aires, García was ordained to the priesthood on November 18, 1983.

On June 21, 2003, he was appointed auxiliary bishop of Buenos Aires and titular bishop of Ipagro. García received his episcopal consecration on the following August 16 from Jorge Mario Bergoglio, archbishop of Buenos Aires, the later pope Francis, with auxiliary bishops of Buenos Aires, Jorge Eduardo Lozano and José Antonio Gentico, serving as co-consecrators.

External links 

 catholic-hierarchy.org, Bishop Eduardo Horacio García

1956 births
21st-century Roman Catholic bishops in Argentina
Living people
Roman Catholic bishops of Buenos Aires